The Old Drift is a 2019 historical fiction and Science fiction novel by Zambian author Namwali Serpell. Set in Rhodesia/Zambia, it is Serpell's debut novel and follows the lives of three interwoven families in three generations. It won the 2020 Anisfield-Wolf Book Award as well as the Arthur C. Clarke Award

Plot 
The novel is a saga that follows three families: one Zambian, one Italian, and one Indian. These families are intertwined by the actions of the novel's first narrator, Percy M. Clark, who is based on a real man from Cambridge, England, who moved to Zambia (then Rhodesia) in the early 20th century as one of Europe's many colonists across the African continent. In the novel's first chapter, Percy details some of his encounters as an early settler in The Old Drift, a settlement near Victoria Falls. He details the settlement's changing name, its growing population, and his racist views of the native Zambians. On one such occasion, Percy's actions at a bar one night cause a young girl to strike a young Zambian boy so hard that "he became an imbecile, forever smiling at the daisies," as Percy says. This Zambian boy reappears when Percy accidentally shoots him one day, and later learns that his name is N'gulubu. This series of events is the cause behind the intertwining of the families, which is slowly revealed through the rest of the novel as Serpell details the lives of the family members on the family tree: the Grandmothers (Sibilla, Agnes, and Matha), the Mothers (Sylvia, Isabella, and Thandiwe), and their Children (Joseph, Jacob, and Naila).

Reception 
The book received positive reviews from critics. Reviewing it in The Guardian, Nadifa Mohamed wrote: "Namwali Serpell’s first novel is a rambunctious epic that traces the intertwined histories of three families over three generations. …Serpell is an ambitious and talented writer, with the chutzpah to work on a huge canvas." The Observer's review concluded, "By the end, set in a near future involving a new digital device embedded in the user’s skin, we realise how slyly Serpell is testing our assumptions, before a cunning last-minute swerve forces us to question why we don’t consider science fiction a viable mode for the great African novel."

In The Old Drift, Serpell experiments with different forms of narrative in order to help readers view the story from different viewpoints. NPR's Annalisa Quinn called Serpell's narrative style "florid, but the excess often comes with a point. These are indeed three ways humans think about space: As something legible and predictive, as a resource to exploit, and as a source of beauty and awe. You also get the sense that the descriptive excess is a conscious choice".

Awards 
 2020 — Anisfield-Wolf Book Award
 2020 — Arthur C. Clarke Award
 2019 — Grand Prix of Literary Associations
 Finalist for 2020 Nommo Award

References

Zambian novels
2019 debut novels
Africanfuturist novels
2019 science fiction novels
Historical novels